Andrejs Krūkliņš (10 January 1891 – 30 November 2001) was a Latvian track and field athlete who competed for the Russian Empire in the 1912 Summer Olympics.

In 1912 he finished 5th in his semi-final heat of the 1500 metres competition and did not advance to the final. He also participated in the marathon event but was not able to finish the race.

References

External links
list of Latvian athletes

1891 births
Latvian male middle-distance runners
Latvian male long-distance runners
Olympic competitors for the Russian Empire
Athletes (track and field) at the 1912 Summer Olympics
Latvian male marathon runners
Athletes from Riga
Year of death missing
Latvian centenarians